The 1984 Taça de Portugal Final was the final match of the 1983–84 Taça de Portugal, the 44th season of the Taça de Portugal, the premier Portuguese football cup competition organized by the Portuguese Football Federation (FPF). The match was played on 1 May 1984 at the Estádio Nacional in Oeiras, and opposed two Primeira Liga sides: Porto and Rio Ave. Porto defeated Rio Ave 4–1 to claim the Taça de Portugal for a fifth time.

In Portugal, the final was televised live on RTP. As a result of Porto winning the Taça de Portugal, the Dragões qualified for the 1984 Supertaça Cândido de Oliveira where they took on 1983–84 Primeira Divisão winners Benfica.

Match

Details

References

1984
Taca
FC Porto matches
Rio Ave F.C. matches